Scopula vittora is a moth of the  family Geometridae. It is found in Mexico.

References

Moths described in 1901
vittora
Moths of Central America